Louisiana Highway 28 (LA 28) is a state highway located in central Louisiana.  It runs  in an east–west direction from the junction of U.S. Highway 171 (US 171) and LA 8 in Leesville to US 84 west of Jonesville.

Route description
From the west, LA 28 begins at a roundabout intersection with US 171, at the north city limits of Leesville in Vernon Parish, running concurrent with LA 8. The highway intersects with LA 121 then LA 465 and a few miles after this enters Rapides Parish then Gardner before entering Alexandria. Between Leesville and Alexandria LA 28 is known as the Alexandria Highway. In Alexandria LA 28 is called Coliseum Boulevard. LA 28 intersects with MacArthur Drive where signs direct traffic to merge with north MacArthur Drive and intersect and runs concurrent with Interstate 49. After merging onto MacArthur Drive BR LA 28 exits and follows through downtown Alexandria city streets. This was the original route until December 2007. LA 28 exits and merges with US 167 east at the Casson Street exit in Pineville and becomes a part of the Pineville Expressway, which proceeds west along the Fulton Street Bridge, named for Alexander Fulton, the founder of Alexandria. This bridge links LA 28 over the Red River between Pineville and Alexandria. LA 28 exits at Holloway Prairie Road and continues east. Shortly after intersecting with LA 115, LA 28 enters La Salle Parish. East of Walters, LA 28 enters Catahoula Parish. LA 28 terminates at US 84 between Jena and Jonesville.

Much of LA 28 is a four-lane divided highway with a  speed limit. East of Pineville, it is a two lane undivided road to the eastern end at US 84.

Major intersections

Business route

Louisiana Highway 28 Business (LA 28 Bus.) runs  in a general east–west direction in the city of Alexandria.  It travels along the former alignment of mainline LA 28, which has been moved onto I-49 through the downtown area.

LA 28 Bus. travels along a series of undivided two-lane city streets.  From the west, the route begins on Monroe Street from its intersection with MacArthur Drive.  At Bolton Avenue (US 165 Bus./LA 1), LA 28 Bus. turns southeast and proceeds to an intersection with US 167 Bus. (Mason/Overton Streets).  LA 28 Bus. turns northeast with US 167 Bus. and LA 1 and travels under I-49.  It then transitions onto the frontage roads alongside the elevated mainline route of US 167/LA 28 (Pineville Expressway).  Both business routes take the entrance ramps to rejoin the mainline routes, which proceed ahead across the Red River bridge.

Major intersections

See also

References

External links

La DOTD State, District, and Parish Maps

0028
Alexandria, Louisiana
Transportation in Vernon Parish, Louisiana
Transportation in Rapides Parish, Louisiana
Transportation in LaSalle Parish, Louisiana
Transportation in Catahoula Parish, Louisiana
Transportation in Alexandria metropolitan area, Louisiana
Pineville, Louisiana